William Roach may refer to:

 William N. Roach (1840–1902), United States Senator from North Dakota
 William Henry Roach (1784–1861), merchant and politician in Nova Scotia
 Bill Roach (footballer) (1925–2016), Australian rules footballer
 William Roach (cricketer) (1914–1944), Australian cricketer

See also 
 William Roache (born 1932), English television actor
 William James Roache (born 1985), his son and fellow actor